Louise Astoud-Trolley (August, 1817 – January 15, 1883) was a French sculptor and painter.

Biography 
Born in Paris, Louise Pauline Marie Astoud became a student of her mother and of the painter Jean-Jacques Monanteuil. She exhibited in the Paris Salon from 1865 à 1878. She was the secretary of the artist's society founded by Isidore Taylor. Astou-Trolley married  François Alfred Trolley de Prévaux, a professor in the faculty of law at the University of Caen, and chevalier of the French Légion d'honneur.

Works

Sculpture
 Auguste Préault, Salon of 1865,  bronze medaillon. Collection of the musée d'Orsay, Paris
 Elie Sorin, bas-relief, musée des beaux-arts d'Angers
 La Vierge et l'Enfant entourés de saint Julien et saint Nicolas de Myre, oil on canvas, after the work of  Lorenzo di Credi (1494), Allières. église paroissiale Saint-Roch

Painting
 Jesucrist aparegut a la Magdalena, 1866.
 Retrat de l'emperadriu Eugenia de Montijo (1869) replica from the original by Franz Xaver Winterhalter.
 La Verge amb el Nen i Sant Julià i Sant Nicolau de Mira, painting. Parochial Church of Saint-Roque, Allières·. copied from the original 1994 work by the Florentine painter Lorenzo di Credi.

References 

19th-century French women artists
19th-century French painters
1817 births
1883 deaths
Painters from Paris